Pyramidale may refer to:

 Ellobium pyramidale a species of small, air-breathing, saltmarsh snail, a terrestrial pulmonate gastropod mollusk in the family Ellobiidae
 Ochroma pyramidale, commonly known as the balsa tree
 Triquetral bone, also known by the Latin term os pyramidale

Taxonomy disambiguation pages